4:30 is a 2005 Singaporean film directed by filmmaker Royston Tan and starring Xiao Li Yuan and Kim Young-jun. It is Tan's second feature after 15: the Movie.  The film is made on a budget of S$400,000. It was released in Singapore on 29 June 2006.

The film participated in the 2005 NHK Asian Film Festival. It also won the Grand Prix Award for Best Film at the 2006 Bratislava International Film Festival, the Netpac Award at the 26th Hawaii International Film Festival, and the Best Film Award at the Rome Asian Film Festival.

Critical response 
Felix Cheong of Today gave it 4 out of 5 pluses.

References

External links
 
 

2005 films
2000s Korean-language films
2000s English-language films
2000s Mandarin-language films
2005 drama films
Singaporean drama films
2005 multilingual films
Singaporean multilingual films